The following is a list of notable people associated with Truman State University, located in the American city of Kirksville, Missouri.

Notable alumni and faculty

Politics and government
 Samuel W. Arnold – former US Congressman from Missouri's 1st district
 Jedh Colby Barker – United States Marine Corps, posthumous recipient of the Medal of Honor from the Vietnam War
 Robert J. Behnen – genealogist; former Republican member of the Missouri House of Representatives
 Beryl Franklin Carroll – 20th governor of Iowa
 John W. Cauthorn – former Republican member of the Missouri State Senate
 Mike Colona – Democratic member of the Missouri House of Representatives
 Sean J. Cooksey – Commissioner of the Federal Election Commission
 John V. Cox – retired United States Marine Corps aviator and Major General
 Duke Cunningham – United States Navy veteran and former Republican member of the United States House of Representatives from California's 50th Congressional District from 1991 to 2005
 Harsha de Silva – Deputy Minister of Foreign Affairs in Sri Lanka
 Hung Hsiu-chu (Continuing Education)  – Deputy Speaker of the Legislative Yuan of Republic of China, Chairman of Kuomintang.
 Alphonso Jackson – 13th United States Secretary of Housing and Urban Development (HUD)
 Lyda Krewson – Mayor of St. Louis
 Afoa Moega Lutu – is an American Samoan politician and lawyer who has served as the former Attorney General of in two different administrations.
 Clare Magee – U.S. Representative from Missouri
 Rebecca McClanahan – RN and professor of nursing; former  Democratic member of the Missouri House of Representatives
 Susana A. Mendoza – current Comptroller for the State of Illinois; former City Clerk for the City of Chicago; former member of the Illinois House of Representatives
 John R. Murdock – U.S. Representative from Arizona
 John Pershing – Army Officer who achieved rank of General of the Armies
 Milton Andrew Romjue – U.S. Representative from Missouri
 Mary Rhodes Russell – judge on the Supreme Court of Missouri – appointed in 2004 and retained in 2006
 Ed Schieffer – Democratic member of the Missouri House of Representatives
 Eric Schmitt – Republican member of the Missouri Senate, 46th State Treasurer of Missouri (2017–2019), 43rd Attorney General of Missouri (2019–2023), U.S. Senator (2023–present)
 Fred Schwengel – Republican member of the U.S. House of Representatives, 1955-1965 & 1967-73
 Scott Sifton – Democratic candidate for United States Senate, member of the Missouri Senate (2013–2021)
 Dan A. Sullivan – Republican member of the Arkansas House of Representatives from Jonesboro since 2015
 Arthur L. Willard – U.S. Navy Vice Admiral and recipient of the Navy Cross

Media and the arts
 Kristopher Battles – American artist, known as the last remaining USMC combat artist in 2010
 Sandra Benitez – American novelist
 Corinne Brinkerhoff – television producer and writer
 Jenna Fischer – actress, best known for her role as Pam Beesly in the U.S. adaptation of The Office
 Kevin C. Fitzpatrick – non-fiction writer best known for his research of Dorothy Parker and the Algonquin Round Table
 Mike Chen – Chinese-born American YouTuber
 Lori Nix – printer and photographer known for her work with dioramas
 Tara Osseck – was Miss Missouri in 2009
 Prajwal Parajuly – Nepali-speaking Indian author of The Gurkha's Daughter
 Rhonda Vincent – bluegrass singer, International Bluegrass Music Association's female vocalist of the year 2000–2006

Education
 Marc Becker – Professor of History, included in The Professors: The 101 Most Dangerous Academics in America
 Jason Beckfield - Professor of Sociology at Harvard University
 Glenn Frank – President of the University of Wisconsin–Madison
 Huping Ling – Professor of History
 Emmanuel Nnadozie, Ph.D. – Nigerian economist, author, educator; founder of the Truman McNair Program

Science and technology
 Harry H. Laughlin – leading eugenicist in the first half of the 20th century
 Charlie Miller - computer security researcher known for identifying vulnerabilities in Apple products and cars

Athletics
 Ray Armstead – gold medal winner in the 1984 Olympics (4 × 400 m relay) 
 Gene Bartow – college basketball head coach for UCLA, UAB, Illinois, and Memphis
 Brian Dzingai –  Zimbabwean Olympic sprinter
 Lenvil Elliott – former professional American football player who played running back for nine seasons in the NFL
 Don Faurot – conference champion football and basketball head coach, member of the College Football Hall of Fame
 Harry Gallatin – Truman men's basketball player, NBA player for the New York Knicks and the Detroit Pistons, coach of the New York Knicks and member of the Basketball Hall of Fame
 Glenn Jacobs – WWE wrestler best known as "Kane", played both football and basketball for Truman; current mayor of Knox County, Tennessee
 Gloria McCloskey – All-American Girls Professional Baseball League player
 Mike Morris – former long snapper for the Minnesota Vikings; current radio host on 1500 ESPN in Minneapolis
 Al Nipper – Major League Baseball coach; former pitcher for the Boston Red Sox, Chicago Cubs, and Cleveland Indians
 Ken Norton – boxer (one of the few to beat Muhammad Ali)
 Bill Seman – former Canadian football player who played for the Hamilton Tiger-Cats
 Sharron Washington – former Canadian football player who played for the Hamilton Tiger-Cats
 Gregg Williams – Super Bowl-winning defensive coordinator for the New Orleans Saints, Buffalo Bills former head coach

Presidents
These persons have served as presidents or interim presidents of North Missouri Normal and Commercial School (1867–1868), North Missouri Normal School (1868–1870), North Missouri Normal School of the 1st District (1870–1918), Northeast Missouri State Teachers College (1918–1968), Northeast Missouri State College (1968–1972), Northeast Missouri State University (1972–1996), and Truman State University (1996–present).

References

External links
 Truman State University Alumni Association

Truman State University people